The Turku Region, The City Region of Turku and Greater Turku all refer to regions of different size surrounding Turku, the capital city of the region of Southwest Finland. The Turku Region is one of the Sub-regions of Finland. It is located in the southwest of Finland and the area has around 300,000 inhabitants. More exclusive urban area the city region of Turku  with population around 235,000 and second highest population density (586/km²) among city regions. The region has three universities and four polytechnics. Biotechnology  and ICT  are one of their most important sectors. In fact the largest bio-industrial cluster in Finland locates in Turku, as well as from Turku to Salo is one of the principal concentrations of ICT in Finland. Because The Turku Region lies on the coast of the Baltic Sea it has strong logistical activity. The region's two significant seaports the Port of Turku and the Port of Naantali and shipyard industry are big employers in the area. The Turku Region has also growing activity on air cargo logistics. LogiCity  is a concept of Pilot Turku to create logistic cluster around Turku Airport, in where logistic industries of marine, plane, train and truck cargo can be met with manufacturers and commercial markets to share synergy benefits. TNT Airways is one of the logistic operators in the LogiCity of Turku.

Definitions of the Turku Region
In the strictest definition the city region the area consist of four municipalities with city status Kaarina, Naantali, Raisio and Turku, however in some definitions also Aura, Lieto, Paimio, Piikkiö, Rusko are counted in. In case of the Turku Region is defined according to LAU 1 (number 023) it will include all 11 municipalities listed below.

Geography

 The Turku Region is located in the southwestern corner of Finland around the city of Turku. It is part of the region Southwest Finland and Western Finland. It shares borders with the sub-region of Salo in east, the subregion of Loimaa in northeast, Vakka-Suomi in north and Åboland in southwest. The Turku Region has part of the Archipelago Sea southwest along with its several islands.

The city region of Turku is formed of four major cities. Turku in the middle, Naantali and Raisio in west and Kaarina east. Coastline is occupied by two seaports one of Naantali and one of Turku. All four cities are connected with the Turku Ring Road and the Kaarinantie road. It has connections to E18, E63 highways, national roads 1, 8, 9 and 10. Turku Airport is located north of the city and the Ring Road and its area is partly shared between Rusko and Turku. To the north-east of the airport is where the city region ends and the interior of Finland with its forests and countryside begins.

Because big part of the region is on the Archipelago Sea, there are several islands in the area and some of the municipalities are entirely on them, such as Rymättylä for example. In the city region of Turku are some of the most notable islands of the Archipelago Sea like Luonnonmaa in Naantali, Hirvensalo, Kakskerta and Ruissalo in Turku, and Kuusisto in Kaarina. Islands are not so populated excluding Hirvensalo in Turku which is really near the center. Most of them are covered by woods but near the mainland there are field areas.

Most of the waters in the Turku Region are concentrated in the Archipelago Sea, but there are also a few lakes and reservoirs of which some are on the islands. The sea is at most part narrow straits between islands. At most part the waters are quite shallow but major sea routes can be used even by the biggest ship cruisers in the world which some are made in the shipyard in Turku.

Mainland is full of small hills, valleys and river valleys. Hills are often rocky as like the islands of archipelago and actually those hills used to be part of the archipelago short after the ice age, but they rose from the sea and got connected to the mainland. Some of the hills used to serve as guardian towers in the age of vikings, who used to rob villages on the Baltic Sea. When guards spotted the vikings they set up an alarm fire on the top of the hill that other guardian hills on the row would see it and make their own fire. One of such hills is Vartiovuori in Turku, which actually means "Guardian Mountain". The river valleys have always been places of settlement, safe from the open sea yet close and connected to it. When valleys aren't populated they are usually occupied by grain fields.

Urbanization

  Inside the circle roads the majority of the population of the Turku Region lives. Population density is quite high. Outside of the city region population density drops sharply and urbanization is more separately concentrated and surrounded by countryside. Though the city region of Turku in whole picture has low population density it is good to notice that there are large unpopulated areas inside the city limits, but activity and inhabitation are actually more concentrated. These more populated areas do not exist only in Turku, but continue through four cities from Naantali to Kaarina. This area has actually been considered as one city in many concepts of the future though at this moment there are no such reforms coming up. Instead of that Naantali will be merged with Merimasku, Rymättylä and Velkua in 2009.

The sub-region's heart is the Market Square in the centre of Turku. The city centre is quite small and concentrated, comprising only 4 to 5 km² blocks. Small and sprawling neighbourhoods surrounding the city centre were built around the '50s and the '60s along with more modern buildings. Further from the city centre (around 5 to 10 km) are built the larger suburbs and neighbourhoods which may have their own centers. There are also several big shopping malls.

The bus network is the only way of local public transport in the Turku sub-region though there have been talks about re-establishing a light-rail system. At this moment only inside the city limits of Turku, public transportation can be considered as good, but there can be expected improvements in the near future.

Statistics

The table below lists population, area, and population density for the most central municipalities of the Turku Region area. (Note that terms used are not completely established, and may vary in different contexts.)

References
 Turku from the Finnish-language Wikipedia. Retrieved 26 November 2007.
 Turun seutukunta from the Finnish-language Wikipedia. Retrieved 26 November 2007.
 Turun kaupunkiseutu from the Finnish-language Wikipedia. Retrieved 26 November 2007.
Kaarina-lehti

External links
Turku region guide map
Turku Region
Regional Council of Southwest Finland
City of Turku

Metropolitan areas of Finland
Turku
Sub-regions of Finland
Geography of Southwest Finland